Patmore Heath is a 7.6 hectare (18.8 acre) biological Site of Special Scientific Interest in East Hertfordshire, England, 2 kilometres north-east of Albury. The site was notified in 1985 under the Wildlife and Countryside Act 1981. Patmore Heath is home to a large amount of dry grass, as well as marshy areas. Much turf throughout the site is dominated by Deschampsia, as well as occurrences of Anthoxanthum odoratum.

The site is managed by the Hertfordshire and Middlesex Wildlife Trust. It is accessed by a path from Albury Road and is open at all times.

Patmore Heath is also the name of a nearby hamlet.

See also
List of Sites of Special Scientific Interest in Hertfordshire

References

Sites of Special Scientific Interest in Hertfordshire
Sites of Special Scientific Interest notified in 1985
Herts and Middlesex Wildlife Trust reserves
East Hertfordshire District
Hamlets in Hertfordshire